The Skansens Bergbana is a funicular railway in the Skansen open-air museum and zoo, located on the island of Djurgården in Stockholm, Sweden.

The Bergbana was built on the northwest side of the Skansen hill for the Stockholm Exhibition of 1897, by Von Roll. Service was provided by small 16 seat cars. The funicular was in daily operation until the 1940s, and in summer only operation until it completely closed in 1959. During the 1970s the railway was restored and slightly extended, reopening in 1973. Von Roll again supplied the equipment, including new and larger cars.

The funicular has the following technical parameters:

Length: 
Height: 
Maximum steepness: 24.7 %
Capacity: 45 people per car
Trip time: 90 seconds
Maximum speed: 
Configuration: single track with passing loop
Track gauge: 
Traction: Electricity

See also 
List of funicular railways

References

External links
The Skansen Funicular Railway

Railway lines opened in 1897
Bergabana
Funicular railways in Sweden
World's fair sites in Stockholm
Metre gauge railways in Sweden
1897 establishments in Sweden